Engilchek or Inylchek may refer to:
Engilchek, Kyrgyzstan, a village in Issyk Kul Province, Kyrgyzstan 
Engilchek (river), the river by which the above town is situated.
Engilchek Glacier, which feeds the river.